St Colman's College is a Roman Catholic English-medium grammar school for boys, situated in Newry, County Armagh, Northern Ireland.

The college was founded in 1823 as the Dromore Diocesan Seminary by Father J. S. Keenan and placed under the patronage of Colmán of Dromore.

The College stands on Violet Hill, the same 60 acre (243,000 m²) site it has occupied since 1829, next to the Bishop of Dromore's residence, and the school itself is often referred to colloquially as  Violet Hill.

Motto
The school motto is Bonitas, Disciplina, Scientia which can be translated as Kindness, Discipline and Knowledge.

College buildings

In the 1930s one of the most iconic buildings in the College complex was completed: the Chapel of Mary, the Immaculate Mother of God, constructed at he western end of the present frontage was solemnly consecrated by Bishop Edward Mulhern on 26 October 1938.

Further work continued in the post-war era as new science rooms, a dedicated design and technology block were all added to the college estate. In January 2008, 15 new classrooms and a multi-purpose hall became available for student use. A refurbishment of the existing College building and classrooms was completed in 2009, with all classrooms now equipped with interactive whiteboards. In addition to this, the grounds were developed with two tennis courts, 60 additional car parking spaces for students and teachers.

Enrolment
As a grammar school, St Colman's selects on the basis of academic ability, primarily through the GL examination; it currently has 860 students attending. Enniskillen-born Cormac McKinney was appointed the first lay principal of the College in 2010.

Academic results
In 2020, all of its 129 students who entered five or more GCSEs passed with grades A* to C including the core subjects English and Maths. Of the 109 students who entered A-level exams, 105 obtained at least 3 A-C* grades.

Sports

Gaelic football
Aside from its academic work, St. Colman's is known as a nursery for Gaelic footballers for the senior men's teams of both Down and Armagh. The school is the most successful Ulster team in schools' Gaelic Football. In 2011 the College's senior Gaelic football team was Ulster and All-Ireland champions.

The College has a distinguished history in Gaelic football winning the premier colleges' trophy, the Hogan Cup, eight times in 1967, 1975, 1986, 1988, 1993, 1998, 2010 and 2011. Only St Jarlath's College, Tuam has won the All-Ireland competition on more occasions. The college remains the most successful Ulster college winning the MacRory Cup for the 19th time in 2011.

Other sports
Other sports offered at the College include, but are not limited to:
 handball
 basketball
 golf – St Colman's were Irish & Ulster Schools Champions in 1992 and former past pupil's Rory Leonard & Hilary Armstrong are current and former Irish Internationals. In 2017 St Colman's reached the Darren Clarke School Golf League Final in Lisburn Golf Club. They won on the day 3.5-3.5, winning by holes won. 
 hurling
 rugby union

Music

Orchestra
The school has a sixty-member orchestra, run by the music teachers and with the help of additional instrumental tuition from local musicians.
The school also has two string quartets, a flute quintet, a woodwind quintet, a brass quintet and a band.
St Colman's won the 2005, 2013, 2014 and 2019 Newry Feis Orchestra group Cup.

Choir
The school choir has worked with St George's Singers, Belfast and the Ulster Orchestra, the Irish College in Paris and Le Bec-Hellouin, mother house of the Order of Saint Benedict of Holy Cross Abbey, Rostrevor.

The choir has taken part in six editions of Morning Service for BBC Radio Ulster, broadcast live from the College's Chapel and St Brigid's Church, Newry.  The trebles have performed live in Broadcasting House, Belfast as part of BBC Radio Ulster's Sounds Classical.  The choir has also recorded with BBC Northern Ireland for the programmes O Little Town and Our Wee World. The choir were winners of the Southern Grammar School Regional Heat of the UTV School Choir of the Year 2005.

Also in 2005 the choir took part in the 20th anniversary of Sing Carols which was broadcast on BBC NI and BBC Radio Ulster.  Their live BBC Radio Ulster's performance of Elaine Agnew's commissioned work Blessed was used on the promotional CD for the European Chamber Orchestra's educational programme throughout the European Union.

Organ
The College Chapel has a two-manual pipe organ, originally built by Rieger Orgelbau and rebuilt and installed in the college chapel by Kenneth Jones & Associates, for the use of the students.

Traditional Group
The Traditional Group has two All-Ireland standard Uilleann pipers, two button accordion players, two mandolin players, six tin whistlers, a fiddler, a bodhrán player and a guitarist.

Abuse of pupils

In October 2017, the Diocese of Dromore settled the "biggest ever pay-out in a historical abuse case in Northern Ireland" over claims that Fr Malachy Finnegan, who was President of the College between 1976 and 1987, sexually abused a pupil. Finnegan, who died in 2002, was the subject of twelve abuse allegations made between 1994 and 2016. In the weeks following the scandal, the school removed all photographs depicting Fr Finnegan from the interior of its building.

Notable former pupils

References

Catholic secondary schools in Northern Ireland
Educational institutions established in 1823
Education in Newry
Secondary schools in County Down
Boys' schools in Northern Ireland
Grammar schools in County Down
Specialist colleges in Northern Ireland